Akil Dhahar was the leader of the Sanaag region in Somaliland and some portions of the Bari region in Somalia in the late nineteenth century.

References

Ethnic Somali people
19th-century African people
Year of death missing
Year of birth missing